Java 3D is a scene graph-based 3D application programming interface (API) for the Java platform. It runs on top of either OpenGL or Direct3D until version 1.6.0, which runs on top of Java OpenGL (JOGL). Since version 1.2, Java 3D has been developed under the Java Community Process. A Java 3D scene graph is a directed acyclic graph (DAG).

Compared to other solutions, Java 3D is not only a wrapper around these graphics APIs, but an interface that encapsulates the graphics programming using a true object-oriented approach. Here a scene is constructed using a scene graph that is a representation of the objects that have to be shown. This scene graph is structured as a tree containing several elements that are necessary to display the objects. Additionally, Java 3D offers extensive spatialized sound support.

Java 3D and its documentation are available for download separately. They are not part of the Java Development Kit (JDK).

History
Intel, Silicon Graphics, Apple, and Sun all had retained mode scene graph APIs under development in 1996. Since they all wanted to make a Java version, they decided to collaborate in making it. That project became Java 3D. Development was underway already in 1997. A public beta version was released in March 1998. The first version was released in December 1998. From mid-2003 through summer 2004, the development of Java 3D was discontinued. In the summer of 2004, Java 3D was released as a community source project, and Sun and volunteers have since been continuing its development.

On January 29, 2008, it was announced that improvements to Java 3D would be put on hold to produce a 3D scene graph for JavaFX JavaFX with 3D support was eventually released with Java 8. The JavaFX 3D graphics functionality has more or less come to supersede Java 3D.

Since February 28, 2008, the entire Java 3D source code is released under the GPL version 2 license with GPL linking exception.

Since February 10, 2012, Java 3D uses JOGL 2.0 for its hardware accelerated OpenGL rendering. The port was initiated by Julien Gouesse.

Features

Multithreaded scene graph structure
Cross-platform
Generic real-time API, usable for both visualization and gaming
Support for retained, compiled-retained, and immediate mode rendering
Includes hardware-accelerated JOGL, OpenGL, and Direct3D renderers (depending on platform)
Sophisticated virtual-reality-based view model with support for stereoscopic rendering and complex multi-display configurations
Native support for head-mounted display
CAVE (multiple screen projectors)
3D spatial sound
Programmable shaders, supporting both GLSL and CG
Stencil buffer
Importers for most mainstream formats, like 3DS, OBJ, VRML, X3D, NWN, and FLT

Competing technologies
Java 3D is not the only high-level API option to render 3D in Java. In part due to the pause in development during 2003 and 2004, several competing Java scene graph technologies emerged:

General purpose:
Ardor3D
JavaFX

Gaming:
jMonkeyEngine
Espresso3D

Visualization:
Jreality

In addition to those, many other C or C++ scene graph APIs offer Java support through JNI.

At a lower level, the JOGL (JSR 231) OpenGL bindings for Java are a popular alternative to scene graph APIs such as Java 3D. LWJGL is another such binding.

See also

Project Looking Glass (Experimental 3D Desktop using Java 3D)
Open Wonderland (Virtual workspace environment using Java 3D and Project Darkstar)

References

External links
Harvey presents the current state of Java3D "I’m not Dead!" at SIGGRAPH 2013
Java 3D est de retour (Java 3D is back): Java3D preview setup introduction
Current releases (Java 3D 1.7)
Previous official site and releases
JSR 926 (Java 3D 1.5), JSR 912 (Java 3D 1.3)
Current forum (Java 3D 1.6)
Previous forum and Wiki for Java 3D - Places for collaboration; includes lists of books and users, FAQ, and knowledge base
java3d.org. Tutorial, examples and information
OpenGL.J3D Java 3D Tutorials
Lecture - from Siggraph for beginners
Game Programming ,  in Java 3D (chapters as pdf-files and sourcecode)
Plugin for Eclipse hosted by SourceForge
Example visualisation applets using Java 3D
EMAP, The e-Mouse Atlas Project - A 3D anatomical structure explorer with embedded 2D section made by Guangjie Feng

3D graphics software
3D scenegraph APIs
Cross-platform software
Java APIs
3D
1998 software